Southern Pine Lumber Company No. 28 is a preserved 2-8-0 steam locomotive that was originally operated by the United States Army Transportation Corps. It is one of three survivors out of over 1,500 General Pershing locomotives built in 1917 for the War Department in World War I, originally numbered 396. After the war, the locomotive was sold off to the Claiborne and Polk Railroad for short distance freight service, and from there, it was sold multiple times throughout its revenue career, until 1956, when it was sold to the Southern Pine Lumber Company in East Texas, where it operated until it was retired in the early 1970s. In 1972, the locomotive was donated to the Texas Parks and Wildlife Department, who moved it to the Texas State Railroad for restoration four years later. After over twenty years of being stored, awaiting for restoration to come to fruition, the locomotive was fired up again in April 1996 as TSRR No. 300. It has pulled multiple excursion trains between Rusk and Palestine every year since its return to steam alongside a few other steam locomotives, including 2-8-2 No. 400. As of 2023, the locomotive was reverted to one of its original identities as SPLCO No. 28, but is currently getting its running gear repaired in Rusk.

History

Original service life 
As World War I broke out, railroads across the United States faced a larger demand for larger and more powerful locomotives to ship military equipment coast to coast, and railways across Europe also needed powerful locomotives to carry their own troops and military vehicles. The United States Army Transportation Corps designed a new class of a 2-8-0 "Consolidation" type that would be suitable to be shipped overseas, and this class was to be named Pershing, as named after General John J. Pershing. Approximately 1,500 locomotives of this class were built by the Baldwin Locomotive Works of Philadelphia, Pennsylvania between 1916 and 1918 towards the end of the War. No. 28 was numbered 396 at the time and was one of the locomotives built in November 1917. Most of these 2-8-0s were shipped to France, which had a large shortage of locomotives at the time, and some of the Pershing locomotives were bombed there before the end of the war. No. 396 was among a few of the locomotives that stayed in the U.S., and it spent the rest of the war working in the Norfolk Naval Shipyard in Norfolk, Virginia. 

In the mid 1920s, it was transferred to the Warrior River Terminal (WRT) short line in southern Alabama and was subsequently renumbered as WRT 300. It would remain there into the early 1930s, when it would be transferred again to assist in the construction of the Fort Peck Dam in Montana. In 1941, after completing its duties for the Army Corps of Engineers, it would be shipped to the Claiborne and Polk (C&P) Military Railroad in Louisiana and renumbered as C&P 20. It was never overhauled or put into service on the C&P until September-October, 1944. No. 20 spent its time there as one of the locomotives that were used for short-distance freight trains between Claiborne and Fort Polk. As World War II was winding down, No. 20’s last movement on the C&P took place when it ran westbound from Camp Claiborne to Camp Polk on August 30, 1945 so that it could aid locomotive No. 11 with the switching at Camp Polk. Once the War was over, the C&P saw no further necessity in using steam locomotives, and No. 20 was sold to a private owner, who in turn sold the locomotive to the nearby Tremont and Gulf Railroad (T&G), who renumbered it to 28. No. 28 was subsequently used by the T&G to haul oil and lumber around the T&G system, particularly between Tremont, Winnfield, and West Monroe. As the 1950s began to progress, however, the T&G became one of many American railroads that decided to dieselize early on, and by 1954, all of their steam locomotives were withdrawn.

The following year, 1955, No. 28 was purchased by the Temple Lumber Company, which another year later, was merged into the Southern Pine Lumber Company (SPLCO), a shortline based in East Texas. After being overhauled in the Pineland shops, the company reassigned No. 28 to pull logging trains out of their Pineland mills and into local towns, and occasionally, it would be used for switching services. In the early 1960s, however, the SPLCO also discontinued steam operations, and No. 28 pulled its last revenue freight train in 1962 before being stored in Pineland. By the end of the 1960s, No. 28 became one of only three Pershing locomotives in the world that survived the scrapper's torch, and the only one left with a French-style cab. The other two being No. 101 at the National Railroad Museum in Green Bay, Wisconsin, and Romanian Railways No. 140 117 in Romania.

Texas State Railroad 
In November 1972, the SPLCO donated the derelict locomotive to Texas Parks & Wildlife Department, who was redeveloping the Texas State Railroad (TSRR), a former shortline that lies between Palestine and Rusk, as a tourist attraction. When the TSRR opened for public excursion service in 1976, No. 28 was brought to the property for restoration work to begin. However, the locomotive was in poor condition by the time it arrived, and by the end of the 1970s, the TSRR had lost the right to restore their steam locomotives at Hahn and Clay in Houston, hence they constructed their own facility in Rusk. This delayed restoration work on No. 28 until the late 1980s. Multiple parts of the locomotive had to be replaced, due to their poor mechanical condition, including the boiler, most of the running gear, the cowcatcher, and the tender. Boilermen and welders took the time to get the restoration process finished. During this process, the locomotive was renumbered 300, since the TSRR decided to renumber their locomotives in order of size and wheel arrangements by hundreds.

On April 13, 1996, for the first time in thirty-four years, No. 28 was test fired and subsequently moved under its own power just in time for the official centennial of the Texas State Railroad itself. It would join other locomotives, including 2-8-2 No. 30(No. 400), 4-6-2 No. 1316(No. 500), and 4-6-0 No. 316(201) as a tourist locomotive by pulling daily trips between Rusk and Palestine. No. 300 would also be one of the locomotives that would do the honors of pulling Texas and Pacific 2-10-4 No. 610 out of the Palestine shed and then push it back in by the end of the day. During the Christmas season, No. 300 would be decorated with deer antlers and tree branches for whenever it pulled the annual Polar Express train. With Numbers 400(30) and 500(1316) being removed from service in the early 2000s, No. 300 quickly became the TSRR's primary locomotive, as it remained the standard face of multiple advertisements for the railroad for the next several years.

In 2012, the TSRR was purchased by Iowa Pacific Holdings, who made the decision to revert all of the TSRR's steam locomotives to their original revenue liveries. The Pershing last ran as TSRR No. 300 in December 2013, right before it spent the 2014 operating season being painted black for one of its original identities, Southern Pine Lumber No. 28. That same year, 2-8-2 No. 400 was brought back to steam as Magma Arizona No. 7, and eventually reverted to T&G No. 30. Since the latter returned to steam, No. 28 only operated for the 2015 season before being withdrawn from service for repairs. The locomotive was brought back to steam for the 2018 season, but it was withdrawn again by end of 2019. This time, the locomotive's running gear is in need of extensive repair. As of 2023, No. 28 continues to reside at the Rusk shops to have its running gear reworked. Once repairs are finished, No. 30 is next in line to have its running gear repaired. After that, No. 316's own FRA-required overhaul can begin, and No. 1316's restoration will be next.

Accidents and incidents 

  During its time on the C&P, the locomotive was involved in a derailment, backing up over a large fill when the tender derailed, and ended up backwards and parallel to the locomotive.

 On July 6, 2007, No. 300 was making a West-bound trip from Rusk while it was parked in a sideline, awaiting RS-2 No. 7 to pass with an East-bound train from Palestine. One of the trucks on the last car of the east-bound train rolled into the sideline where the west-bound train was, and the rear end of the car hit the front of No. 300. No one was injured that day, and No. 300 was subsequently repaired and brought back into service.

See also 

 United States Army 101
 USATC S160 Class
 Southern Pacific 786
 Tennessee Valley Railroad 610
 Great Smoky Mountains Railroad 1702

External links 
 Texas State Railroad Official website

References 

Baldwin locomotives
2-8-0 locomotives
United States Army locomotives
Individual locomotives of the United States
Railway locomotives introduced in 1917
Standard gauge locomotives of the United States
Freight locomotives
Preserved steam locomotives of Texas